Fighting with Wire (or FWW) were an alternative heavy rock and punk band hailing from Derry, Northern Ireland. They have toured with Biffy Clyro, Million Dead, Reuben, Twin Atlantic, yourcodenameis:milo, Kerbdog, Helmet, You Me At Six, Nomeansno, InMe, Brigade, Against Me!, Seafood, and Coheed and Cambria. They have also played at the Glasgowbury Festival and Belsonic.

History
Formed in late 2003, the band has gone through considerable changes, notably going through 5 different bassists. The band is influenced by such bands as At the Drive-In, Nirvana, Weezer and Fugazi. Machine Parts was their first single and a video was made for its promotion. Fighting with Wire have appeared on numerous Public Service Broadcast editions from Smalltown America. They are considered by many locals as a healthy influence on Derry's music scene and have, on numerous occasions agreed to help out with youth projects. They work in close collaboration with the Nerve Centre, band members Cahir and Jamie mentored over 30 teenagers at the Music Hothouse. The band also maintain a strong link with other Derry bands, including Triggerman and Red Organ Serpent Sound. They launched their album "Man vs Monster" on 1 December 2007 at the Nerve Centre in Derry and subsequently toured the United Kingdom and Ireland. The band have also appeared on stage at Glasgowbury on numerous occasions.

2008
Having toured extensively and released their first album with Smalltown America, Fighting With Wire gained international recognition through not only national radio station, BBC Radio One, but also online with Shadowglobe an online Radio project founded by UK programming guru Andy Ashton (Xfm) which as a result led the band to signing a deal with Atlantic Records. Fighting with Wire also played  a number of festivals including Reading and Leeds, Oxegen, T in the Park, BBC Radio One Big Weekend, Download Festival at Donington Park. They played at Belfast City Hall on New Year's Eve with Supergrass and The Pigeon Detectives

At a 2008 concert in Spring and Airbrake, Belfast, they stated that if you get anything from this concert, it will be that we are the 'whoohoo' band. This is a reference to the song Cut the Transmission.  A show at the Camden Barfly, London, on 9 February 2009, almost ended halfway through due to the over-enthusiastic crowd pushing forward on to the stage, repeatedly knocking O'Doherty's microphone stand over and bashing him in the face. The band played Sonisphere with Metallica and Linkin Park among others.

2009-2013
FWW were confirmed by Stephen McAuley on Rory McConnell's BBC Radio One Introducing Show at midnight on Wednesday 26 May to headline the Glasgowbury Festival on the anniversary of its 10th year on 24 July 2010. They played at Belsonic in Belfast on 28 August 2010 alongside Twin Atlantic, Lostprophets, and Biffy Clyro . FWW released an EP on 11/01/10 called 'I Am Ursus' due to the frustration of not being able to release their second album. FWW announced that they would be supporting Helmet in early 2012.
FWW recorded their second album under the working title of "Bones Of The Twilight" at Dark Horse Studios and Blackbird Studios in Nashville with producer Nick Raskulinecz. The album's release date was uncertain and for two years it still had not been given a release date. In March 2012, the band announced they had departed from Atlantic Records due to the label's failure to release their album for over 2 years. The first single from their new album, 'Colonel Blood', was played on Across The Line on 12 March 2012. On 4 March 2012, the band announced on their Facebook page that the single would be released on 2 May and the album, of the same name, will be released for free download independently without their record labels. 2 months after the announcement the band then made public they had signed a deal with Xtra Mile Recordings and that the album would now instead be released through them.
On 28 February 2013, the band announced via their Facebook page that they were to split at the end of the year after a final show in Derry City on 28 September.

Discography

Studio albums

EPs

Singles

Compilation appearances
Various Artists - Public Service Broadcast No. 3 (2004)
Various Artists - Public Service Broadcast No. 4 (2004)
Various Artists - Public Service Broadcast No. 6 (2005)
Various Artistis - Kerrang! The Album '08 (2008)

References

External links
Facebook
MySpace
Fighting With Wire on Smalltown America

Punk rock groups from Northern Ireland
Alternative rock groups from Northern Ireland
Musical groups from Derry (city)
Atlantic Records artists
Musical groups established in 2003
British musical trios
Photo Finish Records artists